Neverkovo is a rural locality (a village) in Penkinskoye Rural Settlement, Kameshkovsky District, Vladimir Oblast, Russia. The population was 48 as of 2010.

Geography 
Neverkovo is located 25 km southwest of Kameshkovo (the district's administrative centre) by road. Pozharnitsy is the nearest rural locality.

References 

Rural localities in Kameshkovsky District